Jacques Gerard Colimon (born August 27, 1994) is an American actor. He is known for his roles in The Society and The Sky Is Everywhere.

Filmography

Film

Television

References

External links 

1994 births
Living people
21st-century American actors
Male actors from Los Angeles
American film actors
American television actors